FSV Bentwisch is a German association football club from the district of Bad Doberan in Bentwisch, Mecklenburg-Vorpommern.



History
The club was established 21 December 1966 as a football-only organization and has since grown to include departments for aerobics, badminton, rhythmic gymnastics, tennis, volleyball, walking, pre-school sport and women's sport.

A championship in the Verbandsliga Mecklenburg-Vorpommern (V) in 2008 advanced the football side to the NOFV-Oberliga Nord (V) for the 2008–09 season. The A and B youth sides also claimed titles in 2007–08 at the national level. In 2009 the side voluntary withdrew to Landesliga Nord (VII) where it won the title in 2012, thus promoting them back to the now sixth level Verbandsliga. The club withdrew its team from the Verbandsliga during the 2014–15 season after it lost 17 players during the winter break and was unable to field a Verbandsliga team and now plays in the tier eight Landesklasse.

Honours
The club's honours:
 Verbandsliga Mecklenburg-Vorpommern (V)
 Champions: 2008
 Landesliga Mecklenburg-Vorpommern Nord (VII)
 Champions: 2012

References

External links
Official team site
Das deutsche Fußball-Archiv historical German domestic league tables 

Association football clubs established in 1966
Football clubs in Germany
Football clubs in East Germany
Football clubs in Mecklenburg-Western Pomerania
1966 establishments in East Germany